Quanta Plus, originally called Quanta, is a web Integrated development environment (IDE) for HTML, XHTML, CSS, XML, PHP and any other XML-based languages or scripting languages. Quanta was licensed under GPL before the release of version 2.0 final.

Quanta is capable of both WYSIWYG design and handcoding. It features tag completion on the fly, tag editing through a dialog interface, script language variable auto-completion, project management, live preview, PHP debugger, CVS support, Subversion support (through external plugin).

Quanta is currently developed by Trinity Desktop Environment. Version 14.0.12 adds full HTML5 support.

Features
Project management, including support for local and remote (through the network) projects. Project files can be uploaded to many servers using various protocols. CVS support is integrated, Subversion support is possible through external plugins. Advanced project features, like actions assigned to various project events and assigning roles in a team are also available.
Uses KDE KIO slaves for FTP, SSH (through FISH) and other protocol support.
HTML and XML support: by default support for various (X)HTML versions and some XML based languages are available. This support can be extended either by the user (by importing an XML DTD) or via the "hotstuff" interface, by downloading XML support packages. XML support means autocompletion of tags and attributes, visual editing of tags, document structure viewing, validation/problem reporting, context help.
script language support: by default PHP support is included, other languages can be supported by creating a language description package. PHP debugger interface is included for the Gubed and XDebug debuggers. Autocompletion for built in and user functions/variables is possible.
CSS support: visual CSS editor, autocompletion for CSS.
templates: full site, one document or snippet templates are possible. Templates can be shared via hotstuff.
user toolbars and actions: toolbars can be freely created with stock or actions created by the user on it. The toolbars can be assigned to a language or to a project. The toolbars are also shareable via hotstuff.
extensibility: any type of scripts/executables can be assigned to actions or project events. Users can exchange toolbars through the hotstuff system.
plugins: general KParts plugin support. Any KDE KParts component can be used inside Quanta, by default Konsole, KImageMapEditor, KLinkStatus, Cervisia (CVS) and KFileReplace are configured.
integrated preview: documents can be previewed inside the application using the KHTML engine. Preprocessing the documents through a web server before previewing is possible.
context help: context help for many languages can be downloaded via hotstuff. New help packages can be created by the user.
variety of settings: the application is highly configurable, so everyone can adapt it to their needs.
Built in rendering with KHTML.
Display the source code, WYSIWYG Mode (called VPL (Visual Page Layout) in Quanta) or both.

See also

List of HTML editors
Comparison of HTML editors

Further reading
The People Behind Quanta Plus: German, English (translated)
Review of Quanta+ and Quanta Gold
Interview with Quanta: Eric Laffoon
OSDir.com Project of the Week: Quanta+
Quanta 2.0 Press Release contains info on Quanta Gold

References

External links

KDE-Apps.org: Quanta Plus

Free integrated development environments
Free HTML editors
Free web development software
KDE Applications
Linux integrated development environments